Regula Martha Zürcher (née Scalabrin; born 5 January 1969) is retired Swiss athlete who competed primarily in the 400 metres and 800 metres. She represented her country at the 1992 Summer Olympics, as well as three outdoor and two indoor World Championships.

Competition record

Personal best
Outdoor
400 metres – 52.65 (Lausanne 1992)
800 metres – 2:01.67 (Rome 1997)
Indoor
400 metres – 52.75 (Magglingen 1994)
800 metres – 2:00.90 (Ghent 1997) NR

References

1969 births
Living people
Swiss female sprinters
Swiss female middle-distance runners
Athletes (track and field) at the 1992 Summer Olympics
Olympic athletes of Switzerland
Olympic female sprinters